Koh-Lanta: Fidji is the 18th season of the French version of Survivor, Koh-Lanta. This season took place in Fiji on the Yasawa Islands, and is aired on TF1. The main twist this season is that the two tribes of 10 are divided into tribes based on their ages. Those 30 and under are members of the Coravu tribe. Those 30 and over are members of the Makawa tribe. The season premiered on September 1, 2017.

Contestants

Future appearances
Tiffany Gounin returned for Koh-Lanta: Le Combat des Héros.

Challenges

Voting History

References

External links

Koh-Lanta seasons
2017 French television seasons
Television shows filmed in Fiji